The United Community School District is a public school district headquartered in a rural area outside of Boone, Iowa.  It is mainly in Boone County, with a smaller area in Story County, and serves the town of Luther and the surrounding rural areas (between Boone and Ames.

Dr. Pam Dodge, superintendent of Ogden Community School District, became superintendent through a shared agreement in 2020.  The previous superintendent, John Chalstrom, was placed on administrative leave in January 2020, after being arrested for drunken driving.

Schools
The district operates two PK-6 schools, both on the same campus in rural Boone:
 United North Elementary School
 United South Elementary School

Since 2009, students from United can attend secondary school in Ames or Boone.

References

External links
 United Community School District

School districts in Iowa
Education in Boone County, Iowa
Education in Story County, Iowa